Atenaide (RV 702) is an opera by Antonio Vivaldi to a revised edition of a 1709 libretto by Apostolo Zeno for Caldara. It was first performed at the Teatro della Pergola in Florence on 29 December 1728 for the 1729 Carnival season.

Roles

Recordings
 2007: Sandrine Piau, Vivica Genaux, Guillemette Laurens, Romina Basso, Nathalie Stutzmann, Paul Agnew, Stefano Ferrari, Modo Antiquo, Federico Maria Sardelli. 3CDs Naïve Records

References

External links
 

Operas by Antonio Vivaldi
1728 operas
Italian-language operas
Operas set in the 5th century
Operas set in Turkey
Operas based on real people
Operas